Klas "Klasse" Möllberg (born 21 April 1948) is a Swedish musician and actor.

Career
Möllberg started performing when he was 18 years old. Later he met the 12 years older musician Lasse Lundberg who influenced him to a music style which he would reflect in his works in the future.

Möllberg is best known for his role as Banarne in Trazan & Banarne. He met "Trazan" (Lasse Åberg) for first time in Gothenburg where Möllberg was playing with a band. They are also members of Electric Banana Band. They also appeared in the 1985 film Sällskapsresan 2 – Snowroller.

Möllberg hosted the 1992 Sveriges Television's Christmas calendar, Klasses julkalender.

In 2009, he competed in the TV program Hjälp! Jag är med i en japansk TV-show and finished in 2nd place.

References

Sources
Official website
Information about Klasse Möllberg on Electric Banana Band's website
Interview with Klasse Möllberg

Living people
1948 births
Swedish male musicians
Swedish male actors
People from Katrineholm Municipality